The Shadian incident was an uprising of Muslim Hui people during the Chinese Cultural Revolution which ended in a military-led massacre. The massacre took place in seven villages of Yunnan Province, especially at the Shadian Town of Gejiu City, in July and August 1975; most sources estimate the number of the deaths around 1,600 (half from Shadian), including 300 children, in addition to the destruction of 4,400 homes.

The conflict between the Chinese Communist Party (CCP) and local religious Hui people began in 1974, when the latter went to Kunming, the capital of Yunnan, to demand the freedom of religion granted by the Chinese constitution. However, the local government deemed the behavior of the hundreds of protesters as "causing a disturbance" and "opposing the leadership of the Party". In 1975, the villagers attempted to forcefully re-open the mosques closed during the Cultural Revolution, escalating the conflict and catching the attention of Beijing. Eventually, on 29 July, 10,000 soldiers of the People's Liberation Army were ordered by Deng Xiaoping (however some sources claim Wang Hongwen) to settle the conflict, resulting in a massacre which lasted for about a week.

The incident

Historical background
Shadian Town at the time had one of China's largest Hui populations, totalling about 7,200 people. During the Cultural Revolution, as part of the campaign to destroy the "Four Olds", the People's Liberation Army closed down mosques and burned religious books. Many Muslims set up their own factions to preserve their rights as guaranteed under the PRC constitution. Serious ethnic conflicts had erupted there in 1968 and continued on and off through the early 1970s. In 1974 a notice was issued ordering closure of mosques in the town.  More than 1,000 people boarded a train to Beijing to complain. By late 1974, after an abortive public protest by more than 800 Muslims from Shaodian in the provincial capital, Kunming, demanding the state to honor freedom of religion granted in the constitution. The delegation was accused of creating a disturbance and opposing the leadership of the party. Subsequently, violence erupted between a "Muslim Militia Regiment" and the non-Muslim county administration's command. In early 1975, representatives of both sides in the conflict were called to Beijing, where a truce was negotiated, only to be broken immediately on the ground in Shadian when confusion arose about how the handing-in of illegal arms was to be managed. The situation further deteriorated when villagers tried to forcefully re-open the mosques and refused to pay grain tax to the state as a form of protest.

Massacre 
On July 5, 1975, the Central Committee issued "Zhongfa [1975] 15", which was signed by Mao Zedong and gave the People's Liberation Army the go-ahead to bring the situation under control if all other attempts to end the tense standoff failed. A string of incidents ensued, and at the direct request of the provincial authorities, a 10,000 strong force of PLA soldiers was called in to settle the conflict. One week later, hundreds of Huis had perished and 4,400 houses had been destroyed in Shadian, but also in nearby villages. Officials stated that 130 people were killed, whereas local Muslim leaders claimed that 1,600 Chinese Muslims were killed. The PLA used guns, howitzers, flamethrowers and also aerial bombardment during the campaign.

Rehabilitation
After the Cultural Revolution, the Communist Party branch in Yunnan reviewed and investigated the Shadian Incident during the "Boluan Fanzheng" period, subsequently rehabilitating the victims and offering official apologies in February 1979. The Communist Party under Deng Xiaoping blamed the worst and most violent parts of the Cultural Revolution which were directed at minorities upon the Gang of Four, especially Jiang Qing. After the Gang of Four were toppled by Hua Guofeng, the Communist Party ended the Cultural Revolution and issued apologies and reparations to survivors. The Gang of Four variously received death sentences or long prison terms, commuted to life imprisonment.

The local people received certain amount of reparations from the government for the damages suffered, and after  Deng Xiaoping's Gaige kaifang policy, the Malaysian and Middle East markets have been granted more access and special treatment by the government specifically for Shadian merchants, which has increased prosperity, and also increased religious and educational exchange, as more and more Hui students left for Islamic education abroad, and brought back Arabic speaking skills, religious ideas and practices from these countries. As part of the reparations scheme, the government has also erected a Martyr's Memorial in Shadian to honor the 800 officially recognised victims, whose graves surround the pathway that leads up to the memorial. The government also partially financed the building of the Great Mosque in Shadian which was completed in 2009. It is designed in an Arab style, and now serves as the town centre and a source of pride for the local Muslim community.

See also 

 Mass killings under communist regimes
 List of massacres in China
 Zhao Jianmin Spy Case
Boluan Fanzheng
Xunhua Incident

References

1975 in China
Massacres in China
Cultural Revolution
Mass murder in 1975
Islam in China
Political repression in China
Events in Yunnan
Violence against Muslims
Honghe Hani and Yi Autonomous Prefecture
Persecution of Muslims
Massacres committed by the People's Republic of China
Hui people
Massacres of Muslims